NLM CityHopper, full name Nederlandse Luchtvaart Maatschappij (Dutch Aviation Company), was a Dutch commuter airline, founded in 1966. Its head office was in Building 70 in Schiphol Airport East in Haarlemmermeer, Netherlands.

History

The carrier was formed as NLM Nederlandse Luchtvaart Maatschappij in 1966. Starting operations on 29 August 1966 using leased Fokker F27 aircraft from the Royal Dutch Air Force, it was set up as a KLM subsidiary under a two-year contract to operate domestic services within the Netherlands. The airline saw the incorporation of the Fokker F28 in 1978.

Amsterdam, Eindhoven, Enschede, Groningen, Maastricht, and Rotterdam comprised the airline's network at the beginning. London-Gatwick was added to the network in early 1975.

Despite sharing their operational structure, both companies were separate entities until 1 April 1991, when they were absorbed into the newly created KLM Cityhopper.

Destinations 

The airline served the following destinations throughout its history:

Fleet

Following is a list of aircraft flown by the airline throughout its history.

 Fokker F-27-200
 Fokker F-27-300
 Fokker F-27-400
 Fokker F-27-500
 Fokker F-28-3000
 Fokker F-28-4000
 Jetstream 31
 Saab 340

Accidents and incidents 
According to Aviation Safety Network, NLM CityHopper records a single accident/incident event.

 6 October 1981: A Fokker F-28-4000, registration PH-CHI, that was operating the first leg of an international scheduled Rotterdam–Eindhoven–Hamburg passenger service as NLM CityHopper Flight 431, entered a tornado that caused the starboard wing to separate from the fuselage.

See also 
 Transport in the Netherlands

References

 
Defunct airlines of the Netherlands
Airlines established in 1966
Airlines disestablished in 1991
Dutch companies established in 1966
Dutch companies disestablished in 1991